Mister Bahamas is a pageant that was established in 2012. The first man sashed Mister Bahamas was Pedro Mejias. The competition was produced by a committee of leading men in society known as the Mister Bahamas Organization.

Pageants
The Mister Bahamas competition selects a Bahamian male top model each year to compete in Manhunt International, Mister United Continents and Mister International, the longest running international competition for male models, organised to promote new faces in the fashion industry. Contestants are judged on catwalk and runway skills; photogenic ability; physical attributes; and personality.

Titleholders

Mister Bahamas at International pageants

Mister International
Mister Bahamas traditionally sends its winner to the Mister International pageant. On occasion, when the winner does not qualify (due to age) for either contest, a runner-up is sent.

Mister World
Bahamas participates at the Mister World since 2000. Between 2000 and 2010 the Mister World Bahamas were selected by casting. Since 2013 Mister Bahamas carries Mister World franchise then responses to select the Mister World Bahamas winner.

Mister United Continents
Bahamas delegates were selected by Mister Bahamas Organization for the first time in 2015. Since 2012 Mister Bahamas Organization recently organizes Mister Bahamas contest, one of two winners represents Bahamas at the Mister United Continents pageant.

Manhunt International
Between 1997 and 1998 Manhunt Bahamas delegates were not selected by Mister Bahamas Organization. Since 2012 Mister Bahamas Organization recently organizes Mister Bahamas contest, one of two winners represents Bahamas at the Manhunt International pageant.

See also
 Miss Bahamas

References

External links
 Mister Bahamas Organization

Beauty pageants in the Bahamas
Recurring events established in 2012
Bahamian awards